This is a list of episodes for The Daily Show with Jon Stewart in 1999, this was the first year to be hosted by Jon Stewart.

1999

January

February

March

April

May

June

July

August

September

October

November

December

References

 The Daily Show Videos
 Statistical analysis of all the guests in 1999

 
1999 American television seasons